The Makatao people, also written Makatau or Makattau, are an indigenous people in Taiwan. The Makatao originally settled around lowland Kaohsiung in Southern Taiwan, later largely migrating to Pingtung and even further to Taitung in the early 19th century due to the influx of Chinese immigrants.

The indigenous people historically called themselves Makatao or Tau.

See also
 Jiaruipu Temple, also called Kanapo Temple
 Makatao language
 Taiwanese Indigenous Peoples
 Plains indigenous peoples

References